Dolichocolon is a genus of flies in the family Tachinidae.

Species
D. klapperichi Mesnil, 1967
D. paradoxum Brauer & von Bergenstamm, 1889
D. vicinum Mesnil, 1968

References

Tachinidae genera
Exoristinae
Taxa named by Friedrich Moritz Brauer
Taxa named by Julius von Bergenstamm